S. Abdul Nazeer (born 5 January 1958) is a former judge of the Supreme Court of India, who is currently serving as the 24th Governor of Andhra Pradesh. He is also former judge of Karnataka High Court. He was appointed as the Governor of Andhra Pradesh on 12 February 2023.

Early life
Abdul Nazeer was born into a Muslim family belonging to the Kanara region of Karnataka, that is coastal Karnataka. He is the son of Fakir Saheb and he has five siblings. He grew up in Beluvai/Moodbidri and completed his B.Com degree at Mahaveera College, Moodbidri. He later obtained a law degree from SDM Law College, Mangalore. (formerly known as "Sri Dharmasthala Manjunatheshwara Law College").

Career

Judicial career (1983–January 2023) 
After taking his law degree, Nazeer enrolled as an Advocate on 1983 and practiced at the Karnataka High Court in Bangalore. In May 2003, he was appointed as an Additional Judge of the Karnataka High Court. He was later appointed a permanent judge of the same High Court. In February 2017, while serving as a judge of the Karnataka High Court, Nazeer was elevated to the Supreme Court of India. He became only the third judge ever to be elevated in this way, without first becoming the chief justice of some high court.

In the Supreme Court, Nazeer was the lone Muslim judge in a multi-faith bench which heard the controversial Triple Talaq case in 2017. Though Nazeer and one other judge upheld the validity of the practise of Triple Talaq (Talaq-e-Biddat) based on that fact that it is permissible under Muslim Sharia Law, it was barred by the bench by 3:2 majority and asked the Central government to bring legislation in six months to govern marriage and divorce in the Muslim community. The court said till the government formulates a law regarding triple talaq, there would be an injunction on husbands pronouncing triple talaq on their wives.

He was also the part of 5 judges bench of Historic 2019 Supreme Court verdict on Ayodhya dispute. In which he upheld the report of ASI, which stated about the existence of a Hindu Structure in the disputed region. He gave the verdict in favour of Ram Mandir and thus finally ending the years long dispute with 5-0 verdict.

In the months leading up to his retirement, Nazeer led a constitution bench which heard cases pertaining to the 2016 Indian banknote demonetisation carried out by the Government of India. He retired on 4 January 2023.

Governor of Andhra Pradesh (February 2023–present) 
On 12 February 2023, the President of India appointed Nazeer as the 24th Governor of Andhra Pradesh, succeeding Biswabhushan Harichandan. This appointment received opposition from parties, stating that the retired judge was being rewarded by the government, due to his favoured judgement related to the Ayodhya Ram Mandir verdict.

References

1958 births
Living people
Justices of the Supreme Court of India
21st-century Indian judges
Judges of the Karnataka High Court
People from Dakshina Kannada district
21st-century Indian Muslims
Governors of Andhra Pradesh